Vlăduț Călin Morar (born 1 August 1993) is a Romanian professional footballer who plays as a forward for Liga I club Farul Constanța. In his career, Morar also played for teams such as Universitatea Cluj, Petrolul Ploiești, Rapid București, Panetolikos, UTA Arad or Dinamo București among others.

Club career

Universitatea Cluj
Morar was the most efficient player of the 2010–11 season, after scoring 1 goal in just 1 minute of play.

Petrolul Ploiești
He moved to Petrolul Ploiești in the 2012 summer transfer window, after a mass of players from Universitatea Cluj signed with the "Yellow Wolves".

Panetolikos
On 31 July 2017 he signed a three-year contract with Panetolikos. On 26 August 2017 he scored his first goal in a 2-2 home draw against Atromitos. On 19 November 2017 he scored with a sensational shot in a 1-1 away draw against PAS Giannina, which earned him the best goal award for matchday 11. On 26 November 2017 Morar scored in a 3-1 home win against AEL, which was the first since matchday 6. On 6 January 2018 he scored with a penalty in a 4-1 home loss against title contenders, AEK Athens. On 21 January 2018 he opened the score in a 1-1 home draw against Panionios. On 18 February 2018 he scored two goals, both with penalties, in a 2-1 away win against Levadiakos. On 15 April 2018, he opened the score, just after 38 seconds, in an eventual 4-2 away loss against AEL. One week later, he scored with a penalty in a 1-0 home win against Lamia.

On 3 September 2018, he scored a brace against OFI. These were his first goals for the 2018–19 season. On 16 September 2018, he scored in a 1-1 away draw against Xanthi, exploiting on Živko Živković's poor reaction. On 6 October 2018, he scored in a 2-1 home win against Levadiakos. On 28 October 2018, he opened the score with a lucky free-kick in an eventual 1-1 home win against Asteras Tripoli. On 10 December 2018, he scored in a 2-1 home win against Apollon Smyrnis.

His first goal for the 2019–20 season came in a 3-1 away defeat against OFI.

FC Voluntari
On 14 January 2020, Vlad Morar signed a 6-month contract with FC Voluntari.

Honours

Club
Petrolul Ploiești
Cupa României: 2012–13
Supercupa României runner-up: 2013

Universitatea Cluj
Cupa României runner-up: 2014–15

Rapid București
Liga II: 2015–16

Viitorul Constanța
Liga I: 2016–17
Supercupa României runner-up: 2017

References

External links 

1993 births
People from Sălaj County
Living people
Romanian footballers
Romania under-21 international footballers
Association football forwards
Liga I players
Liga II players
Super League Greece players
FC Universitatea Cluj players
FC Petrolul Ploiești players
Beitar Jerusalem F.C. players
FC Rapid București players
ASA 2013 Târgu Mureș players
FC Viitorul Constanța players
Panetolikos F.C. players
FC Voluntari players
FC UTA Arad players
CS Gaz Metan Mediaș players
FC Dinamo București players
FCV Farul Constanța players
Romanian expatriate footballers
Expatriate footballers in Israel
Romanian expatriate sportspeople in Israel
Expatriate footballers in Greece
Romanian expatriate sportspeople in Greece